Melba Montgomery is a self-titled studio album by American country artist, Melba Montgomery. It was released in October 1973 via Elektra Records and contained 12 tracks. The disc was Montgomery's first with the Elektra label and eighteenth album overall. Material on the album mixed both uptempo numbers with ballads. New selections along with cover songs were included. The album included two singles. The first single, "Wrap Your Love Around Me", reached the top 40 of the American country songs chart in 1973. The album received positive reception from Billboard magazine following its release.

Background, recording and content
Melba Montgomery had become known as a duet partner of country artists Charlie Louvin, Gene Pitney and George Jones. Up to that point her most successful single was the Jones duet, "We Must Have Been Out of Our Minds". Her solo career was overlooked by her duet success up to that point. While on the Capitol label recording with Charlie Louvin, she was produced by Pete Drake. When Drake moved to Elektra Records, he helped Montgomery secure a contract with the label in 1973. It was at Elektra that her solo career would become successful. In 1973, it was announced that Montgomery's first Elektra album would be promoted with a series of new label recordings at an event in New York City. The disc was recorded one month prior at Pete's Place, a studio in Nashville, Tennessee owned by the album's producer, Pete Drake. 

The disc consisted of 12 tracks.The album mixed both up-tempo songs with slower ballads. Among the song's ballads were covers of Jeanne Pruett's "Satin Sheets" and Kris Kristofferson's number one single, "Why Me". Both songs topped the country charts by their original artists. A third cover was the up-tempo "Blood Red and Goin' Down" (first a chart-topping single by Tanya Tucker). Other songs were new recordings, three of which were composed by Montgomery herself: the title track, "Let Me Show You How I Can" and "I Love Him Because He's That Way".

Release, reception and singles
Melba Montgomery was released in October 1973 on Elektra Records. It was Montgomery's first full-length album release with Elektra and her eighteenth album overall. It was distributed as a vinyl LP, with six songs on either side of the record. The disc received a positive response from Billboard, which named it among its "Top Album Picks" in October 1973. "She's picked excellent material, ranging from the softest ballad to rockin' country, and sings them all to perfection," they concluded. Two singles were included on the album. The first was "Wrap Your Love Around Me", which was issued as the lead single in September 1973. The song reached number 38 on the American Billboard Hot Country Songs chart in late 1973. It was followed by the release of the second single in January 1974 titled, "He'll Come Home". The single peaked at number 58 on the Billboard country chart in early 1974. Both singles also reached number 47 respectively on the Canadian RPM Country Tracks chart.

Track listing

Personnel
All credits are adapted from the liner notes of Melba Montgomery.

Musical personnel

 Tommy Allsup – Bass guitar
 Earl Ball – Piano
 Harold Bradley – Acoustic guitar
 Jim Buchanan – Fiddle
 Jerry Carrigan – Drums
 Tommy Cogbill – Bass
 Pete Drake – Steel guitar
 D. J. Fontana – Drums
 Al Gore – Recorder
 Lloyd Green – Steel guitar
 Buddy Harman – Drums
 Linda Hargrove – Recorder
 David Kirby – Lead guitar

 Hank Levine – Strings
 Melba Montgomery – Lead vocals
 Bob Moore – Bass
 Weldon Myrick – Steel guitar
 The Nashville Edition – Background vocals
 Gary S. Paxton Singers – Background vocals
 Hargus "Pig" Robbins – Piano
 Larry Sasser – Steel guitar
 Dale Sellers – Lead guitar
 Jerry Smith – Piano
 Buddy Spicher – Fiddle
 Jack Solomon – Acoustic guitar 
 Pete Wade – Lead guitar

Technical personnel
 Frank Bez – Photography
 Glen Christensen – Art direction
 Pete Drake – Arrangement, producer
 Robert L. Heimall – Art direction, design
 Scotty Moore – Engineering
 Stan Kesler – Engineering
 TD – Lacquer cut

Release history

References

1973 albums
Albums produced by Pete Drake
Elektra Records albums
Melba Montgomery albums